Hanns Beyeler (17 January 1894 – 11 May 1968) was a Swiss architect. His work was part of the architecture event in the art competition at the 1936 Summer Olympics.

References

1894 births
1968 deaths
20th-century Swiss architects
Olympic competitors in art competitions
People from Bern